The 2017 Dumfries and Galloway Council election took place on 4 May 2017 to elect members of Dumfries and Galloway Council. The election used the twelve wards created as a result of the Local Governance (Scotland) Act 2004, with each ward electing three or four councillors using the single transferable vote system form of proportional representation, with 43 councillors being elected, a reduction of 4 members and 1 ward since 2012.

Following the election the Conservative Party became the largest party, with Labour falling from first place into third place in terms of votes and seats. The SNP also drew with Labour in terms of seats as they both won 11 seats.

This election also saw Independent councillors Willie Scobie and Jane Maitland returned, but saw Marion McCutcheon, George Prentice, Tom McAughtrie, Yen Hongmei Jin, Denis Male and Craig Peacock all losing their seats. Elaine Murray, the former Labour MSP for Dumfriesshire was elected to the Council in the Nith ward.

Following the election, Ian Carruthers (Annandale South) was elected as the Conservative group leader, Rob Davidson (Abbey) as the SNP group leader and Elaine Murray (Nith) as the Labour group leader. Richard Brodie (Annandale South), is the sole Liberal Democrat councillor.

On 23 May, almost three weeks following the election, Labour and the SNP formed a coalition to form a majority council with Murray as council leader and Rob Davidson as depute leader and civic head. Although the Conservatives were elected the largest party with 16 seats, they remained in opposition.

Election result

Note: "Votes" are the first preference votes. The net gain/loss and percentage changes relate to the result of the previous Scottish local elections on 3 May 2012. This may differ from other published sources showing gain/loss relative to seats held at dissolution of Scotland's councils.

Ward results

Stranraer and the Rhins
2012: 1x Ind, 1x SNP, 1xLab
2017: 1x No description, 1x Con, 1x SNP, 1x Lab
2012-2017 Change: Conservative gain extra seat

Mid Galloway and Wigtown West
2017: 2x Con, 1x SNP, 1x Ind
2012-2017 Change: New ward

Dee and Glenkens
2017: 1x Con, 1x SNP, 1x Ind
2012-2017 Change: New ward

Castle Douglas and Crocketford
2017: 1x Con, 1x SNP, 1x Ind
2012-2017 Change: New ward

Abbey
2012: 2x Lab, 1x Con, 1x SNP
2017: 1x Con, 1x Lab, 1x SNP
2012-2017 Change: 1 less seat compared to 2012. Labour lose 1 seat.

North West Dumfries
2012: 2x Lab, 1x Con, 1x SNP
2017: 2x Lab, 1x Con, 1x SNP
2012-2017 Change: No Change

Mid and Upper Nithsdale
2012: 2x Lab, 1x Con, 1x SNP
2017: 1x Con, 1x Lab, 1x SNP
2012-2017 Change: 1 less seat compared to 2012. Labour lose 1 seat.

Lochar
2012: 2x Lab, 1x Con, 1x SNP
2017: 1x Lab, 2x Con, 1x SNP
2012-2017 Change: Con gain from Lab

Nith
2012: 2x Lab, 1x SNP, 1x Con
2017: 2x Lab, 1x SNP, 1x Con
2012-2017 Change: No Change

Annandale South
2012: 2x Lab, 1x Lib Dem, 1x Con
2017: 1x Con, 1x Lib Dem, 1x SNP, 1x Lab
2012-2017 Change: SNP gain from Lab

Annandale North
2012 Notional: 2x Con, 1x Lab, 1x SNP
2017: 2x Con, 1x Lab, 1x SNP
2012-2017 Change: No Change

Annandale East and Eskdale
2012: 2x Con, 1x Lab, 1X Ind
2017: 2x Con, 1x Lab
2012-2017 Change: 1 less seat compared to 2012. 1 Independent loss.

Changes since the election
†On 18 October 2018, Dee and Glenkens Conservative councillor Patsy Gilroy resigned her seat. She was appointed as Lord Lieutenant of the Stewartry by Her Majesty The Queen on 5 November 2018. A by-election was held on 13 December 2018. The seat was won by Pauline Drysdale of the Conservative party.
††On 26 February 2019, Labour Cllr Ronnie Nicholson resigned from the party and became an Independent.
†††On 12 April 2019, Castle Douglas and Crocketford Conservative Cllr David James resigned from the party and became an Independent claiming the party avoided making policies.
††††On 5 July 2019, Mid and Upper Nithsdale SNP Cllr Andrew Wood resigned from the party and became an Independent. On 21 September 2020, Cllr. Wood announced that he had joined the Conservative party.
†††††On 25 October 2019, Mid Galloway and Wigtown West Conservative Cllr Graham Nicol died suddenly. A by-election was held on the 23 January 2020. The seat was won by Jackie McCamon of the Conservative party.

By-elections since 2017

References 

 list of candidates 2017

2017
2017 Scottish local elections